Sasthipada Chattopadhyay (9 March 1941 – 3 March 2023) was an Indian novelist and short story writer in Bengali. He is well known in Bengali literature for the series stories of Pandab Goenda.

Life and career
Chattopadhyay was born in Khurut, Sasthitala in Howrah district on 9 March 1941. He published his first literary work Kamakhya Bhraman in Dainik Basumati in 1961 and started working at Anandabazar Patrika under the guidance of Ramapada Chowdhury and Sagarmoy Ghosh. Chattopadhyay worked at Rabibasoryo, Anandabazar starting in 1961. In the meantime, he joined the Indian Railway and was posted at Ghatshila. He wrote many novels, travelogue, and short stories, but became popular and gained recognition for the creation of Pandab Goenda, an adventure detective series for children. Pandab Goenda was later realised on television in animated form. He loved to explore countries and have experiences which are reflected in most of the stories. Chattopadhyay created two more detective series, namely Detective Ambar Chatterjee and Goenda Tatar. He wrote hundred of detective and adventure stories. The story of his creation of Tatar was filmed as Goyenda Tatar in 2019.

Chattopadhyay died from a stroke on 3 March 2023, at age 81.

Works
 Pandab Goenda (Series)
 Sonar Ganapati Hirer Chokh
 Chaturtha Tadanta
 Goenda Tatarer Avijaan
 Panchti Rahasyo Goenda
 Sera Rahasyo 25
 Sera Goenda 25
 Panchaasti Bhuter Golpo
 Aaro Panchaasti Bhuter Golpo
 Debdasi Tirtha
 Kingbadantir Bikramaditya
 Punyatirthe Bhraman
 Kedarnath
 Himalayer Noy Devi

Award 
Chattopadhyay was awarded Bal Sahitya Puraskar in 2017 by the Sahitya Akademi for his contribution to children's literature in Bengali.

External links

References 

1941 births
2023 deaths
Bengali writers
Bengali-language writers
Indian children's writers
Bengali detective fiction writers
Indian male novelists
University of Calcutta alumni
20th-century Indian male writers
People from Howrah
Writers from West Bengal